Czesława Kwoka (15 August 1928 – 12 March 1943) was a Polish Catholic girl who died at the age of 14 in Auschwitz. One of the thousands of minor child and teen victims of German World War II war crimes against ethnic Poles in German-occupied Poland, she is among those memorialized in an Auschwitz-Birkenau State Museum exhibit, "Block no. 6: Exhibition: The Life of the Prisoners".

Photographs of Kwoka and others, taken by the "famous photographer of Auschwitz", Wilhelm Brasse, between 1940 and 1945, are displayed in the Museum's photographic memorial. Brasse discusses several of the photographs in The Portraitist, a 2005 television documentary about him. They became a focus of interviews with him that have been cited in various articles and books.

Personal background
Czesława Kwoka was born in Wólka Złojecka, a small village in Poland, to a Catholic mother, Katarzyna Kwoka ( Matwiejczuk), and a father named Paweł who probably died when she was little, with his last residence was at Wólka Złojecka. Along with her mother (prisoner number 26946), Czesława Kwoka (prisoner number 26947) was deported from her village, and transported from a resettlement camp at Zamość, General Government, to Auschwitz, on 13 December 1942, during Aktion Zamosc which was initiated in November that year to create Lebensraum for Germans in eastern Europe. On 12 March 1943, less than a month after her mother's death on 18 February, Kwoka died at the age of 14; the circumstances of her death were not recorded. Her death certificate, issued on 23 March, falsely noted that she died of cachexia from intestinal catarrh. However, reports indicate that the cause of death was a phenol injection to the heart.

General historical contexts of child victims of Auschwitz

Czesława Kwoka was one of the "approximately 230,000 children and young people aged less than eighteen" among the 1,300,000 people who were deported to Auschwitz-Birkenau from 1940 to 1945.

The Auschwitz-Birkenau State Museum's Centre for Education About the Holocaust and Auschwitz documents the wartime circumstances that brought young adults and children like Kwoka to the concentration camps in its 2004 publication of an album of photographs compiled by its historian Helena Kubica; these photographs were first published in the Polish/German version of Kubica's book in 2002. According to the Museum, of the approximately 230,000 children and young people deported to Auschwitz, more than 216,000 children, the majority, were of Jewish descent; more than 11,000 children came from Romani families; the other children (~3,000) had Polish, Belarusian, Ukrainian, Russian, or other ethnic backgrounds.

Most of these children "arrived in the camp along with their families as part of the various operations that the Nazis carried out against whole ethnic or social groups"; these operations targeted "the Jews as part of the drive for the total extermination of the Jewish people, the Gypsies as part of the effort to isolate and destroy the Gypsy population, the Poles in connection with the expulsion and deportation to the camp of whole families from the Zamość region and from Warsaw during the Uprising there in August 1944", as well as Belarusians and other citizens of the Soviet Union "in reprisal for partisan resistance" in places occupied by Germany.

Of all these children and young people, "Only slightly more than 20,000 ... including 11,000 Gypsies, were entered in the camp records. No more than 650 of them survived until liberation [in 1945]."

Czesława Kwoka was one of those thousands of children who did not survive Auschwitz and among those whose "identity photographs", along with captions constructed from the so-called Death Books, are featured in a memorial display on a wall in Block no. 6: Exhibition: Life of the Prisoners.

Particular historical contexts of photographs of Czesława Kwoka

After her arrival at Auschwitz, Czesława Kwoka was photographed for the Reich's concentration camp records, and she has been identified as one of the approximately 40,000 to 50,000 subjects of such "identity pictures" taken under duress at Auschwitz-Birkenau by Wilhelm Brasse, a young Polish inmate in his twenties (known as Auschwitz prisoner number 3444). Trained as a portrait photographer at his aunt's studio prior to the 1939 German invasion of Poland beginning World War II, Brasse and others had been ordered to photograph inmates by their Nazi captors, under dreadful camp conditions and likely imminent death if the photographers refused to comply.

These photographs that he and others were ordered to take capture each inmate "in three poses: from the front and from each side." Though ordered to destroy all photographs and their negatives, Brasse became famous after the war for having helped to rescue some of them from oblivion.

Auschwitz "Identification photographs" in memorial exhibits and photo archives

While most of these photographs of Auschwitz inmates (both victims and survivors) no longer exist, some photographs do populate memorial displays at the Auschwitz-Birkenau State Museum, where the photographs of Kwoka reside, and at Yad Vashem, the Holocaust Martyrs' and Heroes' Remembrance Authority, Israel's official memorial to the Jewish victims of the Shoah.

Captions attached to the photographs in the Auschwitz-Birkenau State Museum photo archives and memorial indoor exhibits have been constructed by the Museum Exhibition Department from camp registries and other records confiscated when the camps were liberated in 1945 and archived subsequently. These Museum photo archive captions attached to photographs assembled and/or developed from photographs and negatives rescued by Brasse and fellow inmate darkroom worker Bronislaw Jureczek during 1940 to 1945 identify the inmate by name, concentration-camp prisoner number, date and place of birth, date of death and age at death (if applicable), national or ethnic identity, religious affiliation, and date of arrival in the camp. Some photographs credited to Brasse, including the "identity picture" with 3 poses of Kwoka, are in the Auschwitz-Birkenau State Museum's memorial to prisoners, part of a permanent indoor exhibit called Block no. 6: Exhibition: The Life of the Prisoners, first mounted in 1955. Kwoka's likeness is also featured by the museum's Exhibition Department on its official website, in some of the Museum's published albums and catalogues, and in the 2005 Polish television documentary film about Brasse, The Portraitist, shown on TVP1 and in numerous film festivals.

The photo mural including Kwoka's "identity pictures" ("identification photographs" or "mug shots") displayed on a wall in the Auschwitz-Birkenau State Museum's permanent indoor exhibition The Life of the Prisoners in Block no. 6 is captured in Ryszard Domasik's photograph cropped (without the photographs of Kwoka) featured on its official Website.

Brasse's memories of photographing Kwoka

Brasse recalls his experience photographing Kwoka specifically in The Portraitist, an account corroborated by BBC correspondent Fergal Keane who interviewed Brasse about his memories of taking them, in a Live Mag feature article "Returning to Auschwitz: Photographs from Hell", occasioned by the film's London premiere (22 April 2007), published in the Daily Mail's Mail Online on 7 April, which does not include illustrations of these photographs of Kwoka.

Art
"Bring[ing] Czeslawa's image and voice into our lives", Theresa Edwards (verse) and Lori Schreiner (art) created Painting Czesława Kwoka, a collaborative work of mixed media inspired by Wilhelm Brasse's photographs, as a commemoration of child victims of the Holocaust.

On the 75th Anniversary of her death, a colorized version of the photographs was published by Brazilian artist Marina Amaral.

See also

 Children of Zamojszczyzna
 German concentration camp for Polish children in occupied Łodź (Litzmannstadt)

Notes

References
 "Children during the Holocaust". United States Holocaust Museum Encyclopedia (Holocaust Encyclopedia). Accessed August 28, 2008. (Feature article.)
 Kubica, Helena. The Extermination at KL Auschwitz of Poles Evicted from the Zamość Region in the Years 1942-1943. "New Book from Auschwitz-Birkenau Museum: Memorial Book ... The Expulsion of Polish Civilians from the Zamosc Region". Auschwitz-Birkenau State Museum, Poland. July 17, 2004. Accessed August 29, 2008. (Press release.)
 –––. Nie wolno o nich zapomnieć/Man darf się nie vergessen Najmłodsze ofiary Auschwitz/Die jüngsten Opfer von Auschwitz. Auschwitz-Birkenau State Museum Publications. Państwowe Muzeum Auschwitz-Birkenau w Oświęcimiu, 2002. . (Polish–German version.) ["This new album is devoted to the memory of the children deported to Auschwitz Concentration Camp, the majority of whom were murdered in the camp by the Germans or fell victim to the conditions of life in the camp."] Featured in Auschwitz–Birkenau: Memorial and Museum: A Brief History and Basic Facts. (Web PDF). Auschwitz-Birkenau State Museum, Poland. 27 pages. (In English.) [Also listed as: "Published by Państwowe Muzeum Auschwitz-Birkenau w Oświęcimiu, 2003. 383 pages; text, illustrations, indexes (including "Register of Names": 373–81). 24,5x31cm; Polish-German version."]
 Lukas, Richard C. Did the Children Cry? Hitler's War against Jewish and Polish Children, 1939–1945. New York: Hippocrene Books, 2001. Project InPosterum: Preserving the Past for the Future, projectinposterum.org. Accessed August 28, 2008. (Excerpts from text.)
 –––. Forgotten Holocaust: The Poles under German Occupation, 1939–1944. 1986. Rev. ed. New York: Hippocrene Books, 2001. . (Rev. by Rooney.)
 Painting Czesława Kwoka, by Theresa Edwards (verse) and Lori Schreiner (art) after a series of photographs by Wilhelm Brasse. AdmitTwo (a2), 19 (September 2007). admit2.net. Accessed August 28, 2008.
 The Portraitist (Portrecista, Poland, 2005) – 5th Polish Film Festival Programme. Spiro Ark and the Polish Cultural Institute (UK). West London Synagogue, London. March 19 and April 22, 2007. (In Polish; with English subtitles.)
 Rees, Laurence.  Auschwitz: A New History. PublicAffairs, 2006.  . Google Books. Accessed August 29, 2008. (Provides hyperlinked "Preview".) [Companion book for Auschwitz: Inside the Nazi State.]
 Rooney, David "The Forgotten Holocaust: The Poles under German Occupation, 1939–1944". National Review, September 26, 1986. FindArticles.com. Accessed August 29, 2008. (Rev. of Lukas, Forgotten Holocaust.)
 Struk, Janina. " I will never forget these scenes' ". Guardian.co.uk (Guardian Media Group), January 20, 2005. Accessed August 28, 2008. (Interview with Wilhelm Brasse.)
 –––. Photographing the Holocaust: Interpretations of the Evidence. New York and London: I.B.Tauris, 2004. . Google Books. Accessed August 29, 2008. (Provides hyperlinked "Preview".)
 "To Forget About Them Would Be Unthinkable – The Youngest Victims of Auschwitz: A New Album Devoted to the Child Victims of the Auschwitz Camp". Latest News (1999–2008). Auschwitz-Birkenau State Museum, Poland. January 6, 2003. Accessed August 29, 2008. (See Kubica, listed above.)
 Words & Images: A Collaboration. Curators: Stuart Copans and Arlene Distler. Windham Art Gallery, Brattleboro, Vermont, June 1 – July 1, 2007. (Exhibition.)

External links

 Archives. United States Holocaust Memorial Museum (USHMM). (Description of all its archives, including: "A combined catalog of published materials available in the Museum's Library, and unpublished archival materials available in the Museum's Archives. The published materials include books, serials, videos, CDs and other media. The unpublished archival materials include microfilm and microfiche, paper collections, photographs, music, and video and audio tapes." Among "unpublished" photographs in the USHMM searchable online Photo Archives are some of Wilhelm Brasse's "identification photographs", featured online with identification of Brasse as the photographer, credit to the "National Auschwitz-Birkenau Museum", identification of individual donors, and/or USHMM copyright notices. Those who download any of its archived photographs are directed to write to the USHMM for terms and conditions of use.)
 Auschwitz-Birkenau Memorial and Museum. Auschwitz-Birkenau State Museum, Poland. English version. (Includes Centre for Education About Auschwitz and the Holocaust.) Further reference: "Technical page", with credits and copyright notice, pertaining to the official Website and official publications of the Auschwitz-Birkenau State Museum.
 "Auschwitz-Birkenau State Museum Publications: Albums, Catalogues". (English version; also available in Polish and German.)
 International Tracing Service – "The International Tracing Service (ITS) in Bad Arolsen serves victims of Nazi persecutions and their families by documenting their fate through the archives it manages. The ITS preserves these historic records and makes them available for research." (Opened to the public in November 2007.)
 "Portraitist" ("Portrecista") – Official Webpage of Rekontrplan Film Group (Distributor). Adobe Flash content, including video clip. (Access: >Productions>Documentaries>Portraitist). Television documentary film produced for TVP1, "a television channel owned by TVP (Telewizja Polska S.A.)" [Updated "Events/News" re: screenings at Polish film festivals and awards also on site.] (English and Polish options.) (Original language of film: Polish. With English subtitles.)
 "Resources & Collections: About the Photo Archive" at Yad Vashem.

1928 births
1943 deaths
Polish people who died in Auschwitz concentration camp
Polish Roman Catholics
Children who died in Nazi concentration camps
Polish civilians killed in World War II
People from Zamość County